Alegranza is an uninhabited island in the Atlantic Ocean, located off the coast of Africa and is in the province of Las Palmas in the Canary Islands, Spain. It is the northernmost point in the Canary Islands, and part of the Chinijo Archipelago. The island is part of the municipality of Teguise on Lanzarote.

Geographical overview
The area is 10.2 km². The island features a volcano with a crater of about 1.1 km in diameter and an altitude of 289 m. The second highest is Montaña de Lobos at 256 m and following La Rapagura. The northern portion is mainly flat.

Conservation
The island is part of the Chinijo Archipelago Natural Park (Parque Natural del Archipiélago Chinijo). There are no inhabitants on the island.

The Punta Delgada Lighthouse is located in the eastern part of Alegranza. The lighthouse was built between 1861 and 1865 and was designated a historic monument (Bien de Interés Cultural) in 2002.

History
Its name, derived from the Spanish word for "joy," was given, according to some scholars, by Jean de Bethencourt because he felt joy upon spotting land. The island has been owned by the Jordán-Martinón family since the 1940s.

See also

References

External links
 

Islands of the Canary Islands
Uninhabited islands of Spain